Mommy's Little Monster may refer to:
Mommy's Little Monster (album), a 1983 album by Social Distortion
"Mommy's Little Monster" (Gotham), a 2015 episode of the television series Gotham

See also
"Daddy's Little Monster", a 2012 episode of the television series Adventure Time